("The Official Standard"), often shortened to , is the variety of the Irish language that is used as the standard or state norm for the spelling and grammar of the language and is used in official publications and taught in most schools in the Republic of Ireland.  The standard is based on the three Gaeltacht dialects: Connacht Irish, Munster Irish, Ulster Irish. In Northern Ireland and County Donegal, the Ulster dialect (Gaedhilg Uladh) is used extensively alongside the standard form, as the spoken language in primary and secondary schools.

It was first published in 1958 by combining spelling reforms, promulgated in 1945 to 1947, with grammar standards, published in 1953. Revised editions were published in 2012 and 2017. Since 2013, the Houses of the Oireachtas Commission, through the translation department, has been responsible for periodic updates to the standard, with reviews at least once every seven years.

History
From the creation of the Irish Free State in December 1922, successive governments were committed to promoting the Irish language, with separate teaching materials in each of the three living vernacular dialects. Official publications were often issued with Irish translations, including the texts of all acts of the Oireachtas (parliament). When Éamon de Valera instigated a new Constitution, which was adopted in 1937, he established a committee to propose spelling reforms for the "popular edition" of the Irish-language text.

The first edition was reprinted regularly between 1960 and 2004; there were minor revisions in 1960 and 1979. A revised edition was published in 2012 both online and in hardcopy. Among the changes to be found in the revised version are, for example, various attempts to bring the recommendations of the  closer to the spoken dialect of Gaeltacht speakers, including allowing further use of the nominative case where the genitive would historically have been found.

The context influencing the differences between dialects has changed over time.  On one hand, the shrinking of the Irish-speaking areas over the past two centuries means that where there was once a continuum of dialects from one end of the country to the other, the dialects are now each geographically isolated.  On the other hand, national TV and radio stations have increased certain types of mixing between the dialects in recent decades, reducing the differences.

Characteristics
Its development had three purposes. One was to create a standard written form that would be mutually intelligible by speakers with different dialects. Another was to simplify Irish spelling by removing many silent letters which had existed in Classical Irish. And lastly, to create a uniform and less-complicated grammar which should provide less of a hindrance to learners and thus combat the decline of the language.

The building blocks of the Caighdeán come from the three main dialects, namely Ulster Irish, Munster Irish, and Connacht Irish. The standard is described by Mícheál Ó Siadhail as being "to an extent based on a 'common core' of all Irish dialects, or the most frequent forms, and partly on random choice".

A side effect of simplifying the spelling was that similarity to Scottish Gaelic was reduced.

Pronunciation and silent letters

The Caighdeán does not recommend any pronunciation but it is affected by pronunciation because it aims to represent all current pronunciations. This is why so many silent letters remain, despite the Caighdeán having the goal of eliminating silent letters. The Caighdeán uses the former.

Notes

Sources

References

Further reading

External links
 An Caighdeán Oifigiúil (2017 version)
 Translations Department webpage about the Caighdeán

Standard languages
Irish dialects
Irish grammar
Spelling reform